Leonurine (also known as "SCM-198" in research) is a pseudoalkaloid that has been isolated from Leonotis leonurus, Leonotis nepetifolia, Leonurus japonicus, Leonurus cardiaca (motherwort), Leonurus sibiricus, as well as other plants of family Lamiaceae. Leonurine is easily extracted into water.

Pharmacology
Leonurine weakly binds to multiple GABA receptor sites including the GABA-A receptor. but shows much higher affinity as an 5-HT3A antagonist 5-HT3A antagonists have been shown to help prevent nausea and vomiting as well as the negative effects of serotonin in the G.I tract.

Leonurine can regulate a variety of functions including oxidative stress, inflammation, fibrosis, apoptosis, and metabolic disorder.

Leonurine has demonstrated antidepressant-like action and has been shown to increase levels of 5-hydroxytryptamine, noradrenaline, and dopamine in chronic mild stress studies on mice and inhibits the production of proinflammatory cytokines.

Leonurine has been investigated as a potential treatment for cardiovascular disorders. and protects against oxidative damage from ischemic stroke and demonstrates neuroprotective activity against focal cerebral ischemia brain injury induced on rats.

Leonurine protects mice from pneumonia induced by influenza A

Leonurine has demonstrated anti-cancer activity in vitro and in vivio.

Metabolites
Metabolites of Leonurine in Rats dosed orally include Leonurine-10-O-sulfate (The sulfate conjugate of Leonurine), Leonurine-10-O-β-D-glucuronide (The glucuronide metabolite of Leonurine) and a O-demethylated Leonurine analog that has not yet had its structure definitively confirmed.

Chemical synthesis
Leonurine can be synthesized starting from eudesmic acid. Reaction with sulfuric acid produces syringic acid. Protection with ethyl chloroformate followed by reaction with thionyl chloride SOCl2 and then tetrahydrofuran yields 4-carboethoxysyringic acid 4-chloro-1-butyl ester. The chloride is then converted to an amino group via a Gabriel synthesis (with potassium pthalimide) followed by hydrazinolysis (Ing–Manske procedure). The final step is reaction of the amine with S-methylisothiourea hemisulfate salt.

References

Further reading 
 
 Huang, L., Xu, D. Q., Chen, Y. Y., Yue, S. J., & Tang, Y. P. (2021). Leonurine, a potential drug for the treatment of cardiovascular system and central nervous system diseases. Brain and behavior, 11(2), e01995.   

Alkaloids
Guanidines
Benzoate esters
Phenols
Phenol ethers